"Jack Gets in the Game" is the second episode of NBC's second season of 30 Rock and twenty-third episode overall. It was written by Jon Pollack and directed by one of the season's producers, Don Scardino. It first aired on October 11, 2007 in the United States. Guest stars in this episode include Fajer Al-Kaisi, Will Arnett, Kevin Brown, Grizz Chapman, Marceline Hugot, Matt Lauria, Chris Parnell, Sherri Shepherd and Rip Torn.

In this episode, Devon Banks (Will Arnett) finds out that Jack had a heart attack, which occurred in "Hiatus", and decides to use this to his advantage; Tracy Jordan (Tracy Morgan) is still trying to fix his marriage to Angie Jordan (Sherri Shepherd); and Jenna Maroney (Jane Krakowski) begins to see the positive side of being overweight. This episode received generally positive reviews.

Plot
Jack realizes that his boss Don Geiss (Rip Torn) is hinting that he will retire and believes that he, Jack, is a definite candidate to take over Don's job, as the CEO of General Electric. Jack's only other opposition is Devon, who has returned from the west coast, only now with a fiancée who happens to be Kathy Geiss (Marceline Hugot), Don's daughter. Upon returning, Devon, who is secretly gay, finds out from Kenneth Parcell (Jack McBrayer) about Jack's secret heart attack. At a gathering at Don's house, the pair face off against one another during a game of football.

Tracy is still struggling with his marriage to Angie, who had thrown him out of their family home. Later in this episode, the pair reconcile, but only if Tracy allows for Angie to follow him to make sure that he isn't having an affair.

Jenna becomes attached to her newly gained fat when a mishap during a sketch, on TGS with Tracy Jordan, brings her large amounts of attention from the public. Liz Lemon (Tina Fey) is still re-adjusting to life outside of a relationship.

Production
The "Me Want Food" T-shirts which Jenna and Liz see in the NBC store, at Rockefeller Center, were made available from the NBC Universal website shortly after the episode aired. Shortly after the episode "MILF Island" aired, similar T-shirts were manufactured, featuring the MILF Island logo.

Reception

"Jack Gets in the Game" brought in an average of 6.6 million American viewers. This episode achieved a 3.0/8 in the key 18–49 demographic, a series high in that category. The 3.0 refers to 3.0% of all 18- to 49-year-olds in the U.S. and the 8 refers to 8% of all 18- to 49-year-olds watching television at the time of the broadcast, in the U.S. This episode was the highest-rated program, in its timeslot, among the men 18–34 demographic.

Robert Canning of IGN thought that this was a "solid episode", and that Will Arnett's character "was even more entertaining in this episode" compared to his appearance in the episode "Fireworks". He added that "there was little to complain about", and rated it 8.9 out of 10. Matt Webb Mitovich of TV Guide said that he "preferred this episode of 30 Rock" compared to the previous episode, "SeinfeldVision". Jeff Labrecque of Entertainment Weekly asked his readers "do you feel like Liz Lemon took a back seat, and if so, did you mind?", adding that "[Alec] Baldwin and [Tracy] Morgan get the laughs, but like the Tracy Jordan Meat Machine [from "The Rural Juror"], 30 Rock requires three distinct flavors. Don't be afraid to sprinkle in the Lemon."

For their work in this episode, Arnett and Rip Torn were nominated for the Primetime Emmy Award for Outstanding Guest Actor in a Comedy Series.

References

External links 
 

2007 American television episodes
30 Rock (season 2) episodes